Brian Rolapp is the Chief Media and Business Officer of the National Football League.

Rolapp is responsible for the NFL's media businesses including digital media, NFL Network, advertising sales, NFL sponsorships, NFL media assets, television contracts, and digital media rights. Rolapp graduated from Brigham Young University (BYU) with a degree in English and completed a Master of Business Administration at Harvard Business School.

Professional career
Rolapp began as an analyst at CIBC World Markets for their Media and Entertainment Group. In 2000, Rolapp joined NBC Universal as the Director of Business Development in New York City. His concentration included NBC's cable and new media strategies and their acquisition of all properties of Vivendi Universal Entertainment, which include USA Network, Sci-Fi and Trio. After three years with NBC Universal, Rolapp moved to the NFL Network in 2003 where he became the Director of Finance and Strategy. In 2005, he was promoted to Vice President of Media Strategy and Digital Media. In 2007, his title was changed to Senior Vice President. He was promoted to COO of NFL Media in 2011 and in 2014 became the Executive Vice President of NFL Media and the CEO and president of the NFL Network, succeeding Steve Bornstein.

Brian has been named to the Sports Business Journal’s Forty Under 40 Hall of Fame. He has been named as a potential successor to NFL Commissioner Roger Goodell.

Personal life
Rolapp lives in Darien, Connecticut with his wife, Cindy, and their four children. Rolapp grew up outside of Washington, D.C. and his father was Rich Rolapp, the long‑time president of the American Horse Council. He is a practicing member of the Church of Jesus Christ of Latter-day Saints. He is a national trustee for the Boys & Girls Clubs of America and a member of the National Advisory Council at the Marriott School of Business at BYU.

References

External links
Marriott School of Business National Advisory Council
Brian Rolapp Twitter Account

Year of birth missing (living people)
Living people
Harvard Business School alumni
American chief operating officers
American chief executives in the media industry
Brigham Young University alumni